Tauysh is a village in Zhangeldi District, Kostanay Region, Kazakhstan. It is the administrative center of Zharkol rural district (KATO code - 394249100). Population:

Geography
Tauysh is located at the southern end of lake Sarykopa. In years of significant snowfall water flows out of the lake southwards into the Turgay river through a channel close to the village, but only very rarely.

References

Populated places in Kostanay Region